George Edward Wentworth Bowyer, 1st Baron Denham,  (16 January 1886 – 30 November 1948), was a British Conservative Party politician.

Biography
Bowyer was educated at Eton and Oxford and was called to the Bar in 1910.

He married Daphne Mitford, daughter of Algernon Freeman-Mitford, 1st Baron Redesdale, on 27 February 1919. They had three children: 
 Hon. Richard Laurence Grenville Bowyer (17 February 1920 – 29 January 1943), killed in action during World War II
 Hon. Peggy Bowyer (born 18 May 1925)
 Bertram Stanley Mitford Bowyer, 2nd Baron Denham, known as "Bertie" (3 October 1927 – 1 December 2021)

Bowyer was active in local government and was president of the Urban District Councils Association. At the 1918 general election he was elected as Member of Parliament (MP) for Buckingham. He served as a whip for many years. He was vice-chair of the Conservative Party and became Comptroller of the Household in 1935.

He was a Captain awarded with the Military Cross and a Deputy Lieutenant.

Bowyer was knighted in 1929 and made a Baronet, of Weston Underwood, Olney, Buckinghamshire, in 1933. In 1937 he was created 1st Baron Denham, also of Weston Underwood, Olney, Buckinghamshire.

He was elected as Senior Steward of the National Greyhound Racing Club and was the guest of honour when Oxford Stadium opened in 1939.

Arms

References

 Burke's Peerage & Gentry; and Hons & Cousins by F. J. Mitford, 2006.

External links
 

1886 births
1948 deaths
Bowyer, George
Ministers in the Chamberlain wartime government, 1939–1940
Barons created by George VI
People educated at Eton College
People in greyhound racing
Recipients of the Military Cross
Bowyer, George
Bowyer, George
Bowyer, George
Bowyer, George
Bowyer, George
Bowyer, George
Bowyer, George
UK MPs who were granted peerages